Henry Riggs Rathbone (February 12, 1870 – July 15, 1928) was a congressman from Illinois.

Rathbone was born in Washington, D.C., to Brevet Colonel Henry Reed Rathbone and Clara Rathbone née Harris; while engaged, the couple had been guests in the presidential box when Abraham Lincoln was assassinated on April 14, 1865.
He moved to Hanover, Germany, with his family in 1882. The next year, his father murdered his mother and tried to kill himself, then was admitted to an asylum for the criminally insane in Hildesheim; Henry and his siblings were returned to the United States to be raised by their uncle, William Harris.

Rathbone graduated from Phillips Academy in 1888, from Yale University in 1892, and from the Law Department at the University of Wisconsin in 1894, after which he commenced practicing law in Chicago.

Rathbone later became involved in politics. He was a delegate to the Republican National Convention in 1916 which nominated Charles Evans Hughes for the presidency. He was elected as a Republican to the United States House of Representatives in 1922, and served from 1923 until his death in 1928. Rathbone served one year as President of the Illinois State Society of Washington, DC until his death in 1928. He was interred in Rosehill Cemetery in Chicago.

See also
List of United States Congress members who died in office (1900–49)

External links
 

 

1870 births
1928 deaths
Burials at Rosehill Cemetery
Illinois lawyers
Phillips Academy alumni
University of Wisconsin Law School alumni
Yale University alumni
Republican Party members of the United States House of Representatives from Illinois
19th-century American lawyers